George Liversage Barrow (May 1851 – 11 August 1925) was an Australian journalist.

History
Barrow was born the son of John Henry Barrow and his wife Sarah Barrow née Liversedge (c. 1814 – 4 October 1856) in Bradford, Yorkshire, in May 1851. and emigrated to Australia with his parents and three siblings aboard Hannah Maria in September 1853.
He was educated at Mr. J. L. Young's Adelaide Educational Institution, then found employment on Government survey parties, but having inherited his father's literary gifts, he drifted into journalism. He wrote lucidly and rapidly, but would not suppress his own opinions, so was not a success in mainstream capital city media. Around 1882 he took over a sub-editorial chair of the Port Adelaide News, where he demonstrated a conspicuous ability and won many friends, including John Deslandes, James Haddy, the Rev. J. C. Kirby and A. T. Saunders, the amateur historian. He was noted as a  staunch protectionist, an admirer of Graham Berry, and for writing forcefully against what he considered to be Government scandals.

After some friction at the Port Adelaide News, Barrow left and started his own paper, which shortly merged with Charles McMullen's South Australian Times for which Barrow served as editor. He was convicted of criminal libel for a paragraph in the issue of 11 July 1885 accusing Samuel Tomkinson of corruption in respect of his support of a projected railway between  Port Augusta and Phillip Ponds, near Woomera.  He was incarcerated for some months in the Adelaide Gaol, but was not dishonored, for though he may have been injudicious in what he wrote, it was honestly felt and clearly expressed. And the railway never went ahead.

On his release from jail he moved to Oakleigh, Victoria, where his brother John T. Barrow was in business. Melbourne was experiencing a land boom, and he worked for a year or two as a land agent. He then established The Oakleigh and Fern Tree Gully Times, and closely associated himself with the interests of the district. In 1891 he returned to Adelaide and The News.

Around 1894 he moved to Western Australia, where he stayed for a few years.

From around 1908 he lived in Fiji. There he was active politically, frequently criticising the Government for its shortcomings as he saw them, particularly in its relations with the native population. He published several pamphlets exposing these faults, in order that the Colonial Office might not be able to plead ignorance as an excuse for inaction or mistaken policy.
In 1923 he was a candidate for election to Fiji's Legislative Council.
In his last years he lived alone in a remote area of Fiji, not far from the residence of his niece, Mrs Bucknell, and died at either Nadroga or Nausori.  
Mr. Barrow was a well read and very capable man; and also a clever and trenchant writer. Never lacking in courage, he was prepared at any cost to fight for what he believed to be right. His uncompromising nature made it rather difficult sometimes to work with him, but, even when his advanced views could not be endorsed, his friends admired his independence and sterling character. It could hardly be otherwise, seeing that he was absolutely unselfish, and that he lived with no other object than to serve his fellow-man.

Notes and references 

1851 births
1925 deaths
People convicted of speech crimes
Australian newspaper editors
Australian newspaper proprietors
English emigrants to colonial Australia
19th-century Australian journalists
Writers from Adelaide
Australian emigrants to Fiji